Bola Abimbola (born c. 1968) is a Nigerian vocalist, recording artist, and record producer from Lagos, Nigeria.

Musical career 

Abimbola's career in music began at the age of nineteen with his first recording, Silifa Bamijo, which featured a Yoruba-language version of Michael Jackson's "Don't Stop Till You Get Enough".

Abimbola has toured and recorded as a solo artist, as well as with King Sunny Adé, Sikiru Adepoju, and Giovanni Hidalgo.

Discography
 Silifa Bamijo (1987) - Bola Abimbola
 Computer (1992) - Wasiu Alabi Pasuma
 Orobokibo (1993) - Wasiu Alabi Pasuma
 Merit (1993) - Shina Akanni
 Master Blaster (1993) - Sayeed Osupa
 The Man (1994) - Wasiu Alabi Pasuma
 Fuji Scorpio (1995) - Shina Akanni
 Stainless (1995) - Sayeed Osupa
 The Way Forward (1996) - King Sunny Adé
 Lift Me Up (1997) - Kingsley Ogunde
 Tukasa (1997) -  Alhaji Ayinla Kolington
 Buyanga (1998) - Bola Abimbola
 Seven Degrees North (2000) - King Sunny Adé
 Trick Deck (2000) - Trick Deck
 Crisis (2001) - Bola Abimbola
 Ijinle Ilu (2005) - Sikiru Adepoju
 Ara Kenge (2006) - Bola Abimbola

Filmography
 Bore Po (1997)

Awards
He received two Nigerian "Fame" awards in 1998 - "Best Video" and "Artist of the Year".

References 

 [ Review: Ara Kenge by Stewart Mason - All Music Guide]
 Biography: Bola Abimbola - World Music Central
 Bola Abimbola: Ara Kenge by Scott Allan Stevens - Earball Media

External links 
 Bola Abimbola Artist Page
 Bola Abimbola Ara Kenge YouTube Channel
 Bola Abimbola Ara Kenge Facebook Page
 Bola Abimbola on MySpace Music

Living people
Nigerian pop musicians
Yoruba musicians
World music musicians
Musicians from Lagos
Yoruba-language singers
1968 births